or Matchy is a Japanese singer, lyricist, actor, racing car manager and former semi-professional racing driver. He was a member of the Tanokin Trio.

Kondō is also a semi-professional racing driver and a racing team owner. He founded the racing team Kondo Racing in 2000, which currently competes in both Super Formula and Super GT.

Biography

1980–1987: Early recording career 
Kondō was born in Yokohama. Working for the agency Johnny & Associates, Kondō was signed to the record label RVC. His debut single "Sneaker Blues" debuted at number-one on the Oricon weekly single charts in December 1980. With the single he became the first artist to have a debut single to go straight in at number one on Oricon at release. As of 2008, he is the only solo male singer to have a debut single to debut at number one in his teens in Oricon history. The single topped the Oricon charts for five consecutive weeks, and eventually sold over one million copies. 

On March 5, 1981, Kondō released his first studio album Thank Ai You. He wrote the lyrics of the songs "Gloria" and "Just A Dance" for the album. Thank Ai You topped the Oricon weekly charts making him the youngest solo male singer to have the debut album to reach number one on the charts at the age of 16 years 8 months. In 1982, he scored another hit called  which topped the Oricon weekly charts for two weeks (1/25/1982 - 2/1/1982).

In 1985 Kondō moved from RVC to CBS Sony (now Sony Music Entertainment Japan). On December 31, 1987, his song "Orokamono" won the grand prix award at the 29th Japan Record Awards.

1988–2004: Racing career and "Midnight Shuffle" 
Kondō learned to drive when he was already famous as a singer. Kondō had always had an interest in cars from an early age and driving on the track engendered his desire to drive race cars. He practiced and was accepted into a racing team when he was 19 in 1984 going on to having a moderately successful career on Japan's race circuit. In 1988 he took part in the All-Japan Formula Three Championship for the first time. On November 10, 1989, he released the single "Andalucia ni Akogarete", which was his cover version of the single by Masatoshi Mashima of Japanese punk rock band The Blue Hearts released on October 21, 1989. While Mashima's original version peaked at number thirteen, Kondō's cover version reached number nine in the Oricon charts.

In 1994, he took part in the 24 Hours of Le Mans for the first time. He also made his debut in the All Japan Grand Touring Car Championship that year with Team Taisan, winning on his debut race at Fuji Speedway in the wheel of a ex-Group C Porsche 962C. The victory, coupled with a third-place finish in the final round at Mine Circuit, allowed him to finish 9th in the 1994 standings. Kondō remained with Team Taisan for the next season and was credited with a win in the fifth round of the season at Sportsland Sugo despite being ineligible to score championship points on that round because he did not met the minimum distance requirement.

His 1996 song "Midnight Shuffle" peaked at number four in the Oricon weekly single charts. The song was the theme of Japanese television drama Ginrō Kaiki File: Futatsu no Zunō o Motsu Shōnen, in which then-Johnny's Jr. Koichi Domoto played a main role. Kondō appeared on NHK's Kōhaku Uta Gassen annual TV show singing "Midnight Shuffle". In the same year, Kondō switched teams to compete with the NISMO factory team on the newly-rebranded GT500 class in JGTC. He went on to finish 11th and 19th in the 1996 and 1997 standings respectively.

Kondō concentrated his efforts to his full-time racing career starting from 1998, rarely appearing on TV and not putting out any new songs. His occasional appearances on TV were as a racer or racing commentator. On the same year he made his first and only season in JGTC's GT300 class as the driver NISMO's GT300 team, finishing 6th in the standings. Kondō returned to GT500 in the following year with Toyota Team Cerumo, where he would compete for four seasons before retiring from JGTC at the end of the 2002 season. On May 22, 2002, he released a single but it was a cover for his 1985 song "Yoisho".

2005–present: Returning to the recording studio 
In 2005 Kondō decided to make a full return as a singer for the 25th anniversary of his debut. On December 14, 2005, he released the single "Chōsensya", which means challenger. He appeared in many TV programs, held dinner shows and went on a limited concert tour. He joined many of his successors such as SMAP, KinKi Kids, V6 and Arashi on their TV shows.

On January 25, 2006, Sony released Kondō's tribute album Matchy Tribute, in which Hitomi Takahashi covered the song "Midnight Shuffle". He also released his greatest hits album Matchy Best on February 6, 2006. The album Matchy Best debuted at number fifteen on the Oricon album charts. On May 9, 2007, he released his first DVD work, Kondō Masahiko '07 Valentine's Day in Budokan, which was shot at his live concert at the Nippon Budokan on February 14, 2007. The DVD debuted at number one on the Oricon weekly music DVD charts.

In December 2007, it was announced that Kondō collaborated with Johnny's Jr., the five-member of rock band Question?, forming the temporary group "Matchy with Question?" and singing the song "Mezamero! Yasei". The song "Mezamero! Yasei" was used for the ending theme of anime series Naruto: Shippuden and was released as a CD single on January 23, 2008. The single debuted at number five on the Oricon charts and with the first week sales of around 40,000 copies.

Kondō released the single "Banka (Otokotachi no Banka)" on December 23, 2008, and the single "Motto" on December 13, 2009. On February 22, 2010, he released the single "Zanbara". The first track, "Kokoro Zanbara", and the second track, "Koi Zanbara", were composed by Hal and Tsukasa respectively. The lyrics of both songs were written by Kōhan Kawauchi. Kawauchi sent the lyrics of the song to Johnny & Associates in 1989 but it had never been released until Kawauchi's death in 2008. The reason given was that the song seemed to be too sad for Kondo whose mother died in 1986.

On April 10, 2010, Kondō started his first nationwide concert tour in Japan 21 years after his 1989 nationwide tour.

In November 2020, Johnny & Associates announced that Kondō's activities were suspended indefinitely after he admitted he had an extra-marital affair.

Personal life

In the late 1980s, Kondō was in a relationship with singer Akina Nakamori and the two were engaged, but he ended their relationship. Shortly after media reported rumors that he and Seiko Matsuda were romantically involved, in 1989, Nakamori broke into his apartment and attempted suicide.

In November 2020, Shukan Bunshun reported allegations that Kondō was having an extramarital affair with a 31-year-old woman since 2015, which he confirmed. He was suspended by his agency indefinitely to atone for the affair.

Selected filmography

Film
Tanokin Super Hit Series
Graffiti Youth: Sneaker Blues (February 11, 1981)
Blue Jeans Memory (July 11, 1981)
Good Luck Love (December 20, 1981)
Highteen Boogie (August 7, 1982)
The Mysterious Gemini • Y&S (December 11, 1982)
Heart Beat (August 4, 1983)
Love Forever (1983)

Television
 Kinpachi-sensei (1979–80), Kiyoshi Hoshino
 Totto-chan (2017), Hisaya Morishige

Awards and nominations

Japan Record Awards 

The Japan Record Awards is a major music awards show held annually in Japan by the Japan Composer's Association.

|-
| 2010
| Masahiko Kondō
| Best Singer Award
|

Racing record

All-Japan GT Championship results 
(key) (Races in bold indicate pole position; races in italics indicate fastest lap)

24 Hours of Le Mans results

Notes
1.Kondō did not met the requirement for minimum distance driven and was ineligible for championship points.

References

External links
 
 Kondo Racing - Team Director Profile
 

1964 births
Living people
People from Yokohama
Sportspeople from Yokohama
Sony Music Entertainment Japan artists
Sports car racing team owners
Musicians from Kanagawa Prefecture
Japanese male actors
Japanese lyricists
Japanese male pop singers
Johnny & Associates
Japanese racing drivers
Japanese Formula 3 Championship drivers
Japanese Formula 3000 Championship drivers
Formula Nippon drivers
24 Hours of Le Mans drivers
Japanese idols
Oreca drivers
Nismo drivers
Kondō Racing drivers